Maasgouw is a municipality in the Dutch province of Limburg. It is located on both banks of the river Meuse southwest of the city of Roermond. It was formed in a merger of the former municipalities of Heel, Maasbracht and Thorn on 1 January 2007.

The municipality contains a number of towns and villages:

Topography

Dutch Topographic map of the municipality of Maasgouw, June 2015.

Notable people 

 Henk van Hoof (born 1947) a retired Dutch politician, lives in Ohé en Laak 
 Jan Cober (born 1951 in Thorn) a Dutch conductor and clarinet player
 Guido Geelen (born 1961 in Thorn) a Dutch sculptor, furniture designer and ceramist
 Margo Reuten (born ca.1966 in Maasbracht) a Dutch head chef, holds two Michelin stars
 Lies Visschedijk (born 1974 in Heel) a Dutch actress

Sport 
 Annemiek Derckx (born 1954 in Beegden) a Dutch sprint canoer, twice bronze medallist at the 1984 and 1988 Summer Olympics 
 Bas Peters (born 1976 in Heel) a Dutch mountain biker, competed at the 2004 Summer Olympics
 Mark van Bommel (born 1977 in Maasbracht) a Dutch former footballer with 536 club caps.

Gallery

References

External links

Official website

 
Municipalities of Limburg (Netherlands)
Municipalities of the Netherlands established in 2007